Aatish may refer to:

People
Aatish Bhalaik (born 1991), Indian cricketer 
Aatish Taseer (born 1980), British-born writer-journalist
Khwaja Haidar Ali Aatish (1778–1848), Urdu poet from Lucknow, India

Arts and entertainment
Aatish, a 2002 album by Faakhir Mehmood
Aatish (film), a 1979 Bollywood film
Aatish: Feel the Fire, a 1994 Bollywood film
Aatish (TV series), a 2018 Pakistani television series